Muneo Tokunaga (徳永 宗雄, Tokunaga Muneo) was a Japanese Indologist. A graduate of the doctoral program of Harvard University, he taught in the Indology Department of Kyoto University.

Biography
Tokunaga was a specialist in Sanskrit and the Vedas and was also one of the world's foremost authorities on Indian languages. He was an authority on Indian epics, and in 1994 provided the world with the first digital, searchable text, in ASCII format,  of the Mahabharata, based on the Poona Critical Edition. This has now been revised by John D. Smith. Tokunaga also transcribed the other Indian epic, the Ramayana, based on the Baroda Critical Edition, which also afforded Smith the basis for his revised digital version. He was a severe critic of the theories of Susumu Ōno linking the Japanese and Tamil languages.

Links
CiNii-Tokunaga Muneo (books)

Notes

Japanese indologists
Harvard University alumni
1945 births
People from Osaka
2016 deaths